"Burning a Hole in My Mind" is a single by American country music artist Connie Smith. Released in September 1967, the song reached #5 on the Billboard Hot Country Singles chart. The single was later released on Smith's 1968 album entitled I Love Charley Brown. The song was written by songwriter Cy Coben.

Chart performance

References

1967 singles
Connie Smith songs
Song recordings produced by Bob Ferguson (musician)
Songs written by Cy Coben
1967 songs
RCA Victor singles